José Alejandro "Álex" Martín Valerón (born 25 January 1998) is a Spanish footballer who plays as a central defender for CD Mirandés.

Club career
Martín was born in Las Palmas, Canary Islands, and joined Real Madrid's La Fábrica in 2014, after representing Real Betis and UD Las Palmas. Ahead of the 2017–18 season, he was promoted to the reserves in Segunda División B.

Martín made his senior debut on 24 September 2017, starting in a 1–2 away loss against CDA Navalcarnero. The following 26 January, he renewed his contract with the club until 2021.

On 8 July 2019, Martín signed a two-year deal with La Liga side CD Leganés, but was loaned to third division side FC Cartagena on 30 August. On 18 August of the following year, after achieving promotion with the latter side, he signed a permanent deal with the Efesé until 2022.

Martín made his professional debut on 13 September 2020, starting in a 0–0 away draw against Real Oviedo. He scored his first professional goal on 24 October, netting his team's second in a 3–0 home win against Las Palmas.

On 31 January 2021, Martín signed a 18-month contract with Cádiz CF, being initially assigned to the B-team. He made his La Liga debut with the main squad on 15 February, replacing Isaac Carcelén in a 0–4 home loss against Athletic Bilbao.

On 4 August 2021, Martín moved to another reserve team, Celta de Vigo B in Primera División RFEF. On 21 July of the following year, he moved to second division side CD Mirandés on a one-year deal.

References

External links
Real Madrid profile

1998 births
Living people
Footballers from Las Palmas
Spanish footballers
Association football defenders
La Liga players
Segunda División players
Primera Federación players
Segunda División B players
Real Madrid Castilla footballers
CD Leganés players
FC Cartagena footballers
Cádiz CF B players
Cádiz CF players
Celta de Vigo B players
CD Mirandés footballers
Spain youth international footballers